Farha is a 2021 internationally co-produced historical drama film about a Palestinian girl's coming-of-age experience during the Nakba, the 1948 displacement of Palestinians from their homeland. The film is directed by Darin J. Sallam, who also wrote it based on a true story that she was told as a child about a girl named Radieh. It premiered at the Toronto Film Festival on 14 September 2021 and began streaming on Netflix on 1 December 2022.

Plot 

Prior to the 1948 Palestinian exodus, 14-year-old girl Farha plays with other girls in a Palestinian village. While other girls are excited about their friend's marriage, Farha dreams about pursuing an education and going to school in the city like her best friend Farida. Farha asks her father Abu Farha to register her for school, but her father wants her to get married instead. Her uncle Abu Walid is visiting Abu Farha. He asks Abu Farha to consider Farha's repeated requests to pursue education. During the night, a group of local Palestinian militia visit Abu Farha, who acts as the village chief and mayor. They request that he join their cause in fighting during the Nakba. Abu Farha refuses, iterating that his main purpose is to take care of his village.

During the wedding of one of Farha's schoolmates, men meet Abu Farha and Farha fears that she has been promised to be wed. She confronts her father about the event and demands to be told what occurred. Her father tells her that he had accepted her request to pursue education instead and has filled out a registration form for her to join school. While celebrating the news with her best friend Farida, sounds of bombs are heard in the distance. Farha and Farida run to the village to find it in turmoil with sounds from military speakers asking village inhabitants to evacuate. Farha and Farida are found by Abu Farida, who takes them into his car to evacuate. He also asks Abu Farha to evacuate, but he refuses, electing to stay behind and entrusting Farha to the care of Abu Farida. As the car is driving away, Farha leaves the car and joins her father. Abu Farha takes her back to their home and arms himself with a rifle and locks Farha in the pantry, telling her to stay hidden. He tells her that he will collect her when it is safe. Farha is locked in the pantry for days without any news from her father, while she continues to hear sounds of bombs and gunshots in the distance and is only able to glance through a hole in the pantry to the house's courtyard.

A Palestinian family, Abu Mohammad and Um Mohammad and their two young children, enter her house. The mother gives birth to a baby boy in the courtyard of Farha's house. Farha asks Abu Muhammad to let her out but, before he can, an Israeli military patrol stops outside the house and demands the family come out and surrender. Abu Mohammad goes outside and is confronted by an Israeli patrol commander and a Palestinian informant wearing a mask. The Palestinian informant appears to know the village inhabitants and tells the Israeli commander that Abu Mohammad is from a different village. The Israeli commander searches the house for guns and finds the family of Abu Mohammad hiding in the house. Abu Mohammad's family, except the newborn baby, are executed at gunpoint while Farha watches from a hole in the pantry. The Palestinian informant sees Farha from the hole in the pantry and recognises her and calls her name but does not reveal her whereabouts to the Israeli soldiers. The Israeli commander asks a young Israeli soldier to execute the newborn baby without wasting a bullet by stomping on him. The soldier cannot bring himself to do it and leaves the newborn on the courtyard floor.

Farha struggles to open the locked pantry door to get to the baby but her attempts are futile. After ransacking the pantry she finds a hidden pistol, which she uses to shoot the door lock. After getting out of the pantry, Farha finds the baby boy dead. She leaves her village, walking in anguish and despair. An epilogue appears and states that Farha never finds her father and his fate after the diaspora remains unknown. It is believed he was killed in the events of the Nakba. Farha eventually makes her way to Syria and tells her story which now has been passed down through generations.

Cast 

 Karam Taher as Farha
 Ashraf Barhom as Abu Farha
 Ali Suliman as Abu Walid
 Tala Gammoh as Farida
 Sameera Elasir as Um Mohammad
 Majd Eid as Abu Mohammad
 Firas Taybeh as Abu Farida

Production

Development 
Farha was written and directed by Darin J. Sallam—her first feature-length film. Sallam's own family also fled from Palestine to Jordan in 1948. The film is based on a true story recounted to Sallam's mother by a friend, living as a refugee in Syria, about her experience during the Nakba in which hundreds of thousands of Palestinians were expelled from their homeland. Sallam began working on the script for the film in 2016 and had a rough outline of the major scenes by 2019.

The film was produced by TaleBox, based in Jordan, and co-produced by Laika Film & Television and Chimney, both based in Sweden. Deema Azar and Ayah Jardaneh are credited as producers along with William Johansson Kalén as co-producer.

Casting 
This film is the first on-screen appearance for the lead actor Karam Taher. Sallam said that, when casting the titular role, she was "looking for a girl that [she] could stay with for 52 minutes inside a room". Taher's initial audition did not go well. Sallam said, "[Taher] was shy [...] But what really stayed with me was her face: she had a very specific face and very expressive eyes. From one side, her face was like a child, and from the other, she was a young woman—it's a coming-of-age story."

Filming 
Farha was filmed in Jordan with cinematography by Rachelle Aoun. Sallam stated in an interview that "[s]ome of the crew members were crying behind the monitor while shooting, remembering their families and their stories, and the stories they heard from their grandparents".

Release 
Farha premiered at the Toronto Film Festival on 14 September 2021. It was subsequently screened to critical acclaim in Rome, Busan, Gothenburg and Lyon. The film also received post-production funding from the Red Sea International Film Festival and was shown at the inaugural edition of festival in Jeddah in December 2021. On 7 November 2022, the film was screened at the Palestine Cinema Days festival in Ramallah, Palestine. The successful film festival tour also led to a deal with Netflix through Picture Tree International. The film began streaming on Netflix on 1 December 2022.

Political reaction 

Following the 1 December release on Netflix, the streaming platform and film were criticised by Israeli politicians. Israel's finance minister Avigdor Lieberman criticised Netflix for streaming the production and ordered the treasury to revoke state funding to Al Saraya Theater, which scheduled screenings of the film, with the "goal of preventing the screening of this shocking film or other similar ones in the future". Culture minister Hili Tropper called a screening by an Israeli theatre "a disgrace". The reaction to the film has focused on a scene that depicts the killing of a Palestinian family by Israeli soldiers. In the days following its release, Farha became the target of a coordinated downvoting campaign on IMDb, while the filmmakers were subjected to harassment on social media. The campaign "appears to have backfired", according The Hollywood Reporter, with the film's ratings on IMDb quickly rebounding. Sallam responded to the criticism in an interview with Time magazine, noting that she had been subjected to "hateful, racist messages":
The reason I'm so shocked by the backlash is because I didn't show anything. Compared to what happened during the massacres, this was a small event. I don't know why some Israeli officials are very upset about this scene. It's blurry and out of focus because I always said it's about this girl's journey... I feel it is intended to harm the Oscars campaign so I really hope it doesn't affect this negatively... Denying the Nakba is like denying who I am and that I exist. It's very offensive to deny a tragedy that my grandparents and my father went through and witnessed, and to make fun of it in the attacks that I'm receiving.

Reception 
A review in The New York Times described the film as "a brutal kind of coming-of-age story" and that while it "primarily unfolds in a tiny storage room, [the film] speaks volumes". CNN said that the film offers "a perspective on the events that led to Israel's founding that is rarely seen or heard on a global mainstream platform". In a review for The Hindu, Farha is praised for "succinctly put[ting] forth its messaging, conveying the brutality of violence through a barebones narrative".

On Rotten Tomatoes, the film has an approval rating of 100% (based on 8 reviews), with an average rating of 7.5 out of 10.

Awards 
Farha was the winner of the Best Youth Feature Film category at the 2022 Asia Pacific Screen Awards. The film is Jordan's submission in the Best International Feature Film category at the 95th Academy Awards.

References

External links 
 

2021 films
2021 drama films
2021 independent films
2020s Swedish films
Films about the 1948 Palestinian exodus
Jordanian drama films
Saudi Arabian drama films